Hozyusz is a Polish coat of arms. It was used by several szlachta families.

History

Blazon

Notable bearers
Notable bearers of this coat of arms include:
 Stanisław Hozjusz
 Stanisław Józef Hozjusz

See also
 Polish heraldry
 Heraldic family
 List of Polish nobility coats of arms 
 Coat of Arms of Pope Pius IV

Bibliography
 Tadeusz Gajl: Herbarz polski od średniowiecza do XX wieku : ponad 4500 herbów szlacheckich 37 tysięcy nazwisk 55 tysięcy rodów. L&L, 2007. .
 Józef Szymański: Herbarz rycerstwa polskiego z XVI wieku. Warszawa: DiG, 2001, s. 96. .
 Juliusz Karol Ostrowski: Księga herbowa rodów polskich. T. 2. Warszawa: Główny skład księgarnia antykwarska B. Bolcewicza, 1897, s. 109.

Hozyusz